Grodno Airport  is an airport that serves Grodno, Belarus.

History
The airport opened in 1984.

Airlines and destinations
As of December 2021, there are no regular scheduled services at the airport.

References

External links
 Grodno (Hrodna) airport at ourairports.com database

Airports built in the Soviet Union
Airports in Belarus
Grodno
Buildings and structures in Grodno Region